Malkiar is located in Haripur District in the North West Frontier Province of Pakistan, its geographical coordinates are 34° 0' 31" North, 72° 55' 31" East and its original name (with diacritics) is Malkiār. 

The important personalities of Malkiar are Mr. Sardar Bahadur, Mr. Ghulam Haider, Colonel Siddique, Muhammad Ijaz, Muhammad Umer, Muhammad Abbas.

Populated places in Haripur District